Ray Ternent (born 9 September 1948) is an English-born former football defender, who played in the Football League in the 1960s and 1970s.

He was spotted by scout Jack Hixon in his native north-east and Ternent joined Burnley from school in April 1964 and made his first team debut against Southampton on 8 April 1967.

However, Ternent only managed 13 league appearances for Burnley before moving to Southend United in June 1971, where he was part of the 1971-72 team who were promoted from Division Four. After two seasons he moved back north with Doncaster Rovers and also made over 80 league appearances for them before moving into non-league football with Frickley Athletic.

Despite being at Burnley at the same time as Stan Ternent, Stan and Ray were not brothers, contrary to some reports.

References 

1948 births
Association football defenders
English Football League players
Burnley F.C. players
Southend United F.C. players
Doncaster Rovers F.C. players
Frickley Athletic F.C. players
Living people
English footballers